Lepidoscia protorna is a moth of the Psychidae family first described by Edward Meyrick in 1893. This species is native to Australia but has been found in New Zealand since 1978.

References

Moths described in 1893
Psychidae
Moths of New Zealand
Moths of Australia
Taxa named by Edward Meyrick